Robert Savage or variants may refer to:
Robert Savage (executive) (born 1933), president and chief executive of American Express
Robert Savage (MP), Member of Parliament (MP) for City of York
Robbie Savage (born 1974), Welsh international football player and pundit
Robbie Savage (footballer, born 1960), English football player
Robbie Savage (football fan) (1967–2017), former mascot of the Namibian national football team
Robert Savage (Australian politician) (1895–1959), member of the New South Wales Legislative Council
Ted Savage (footballer) (1912–?), full name Robert Edward Savage, English footballer who played for Liverpool F.C.
Robert Savage (cricketer) (born 1960), former English cricketer
R. J. G. Savage (1927–1998), British palaeontologist
Bob Savage (1921–2013), American baseball player
Robert Savage (racing driver), Irish racing driver